Acanthocinus spectabilis is a species of longhorn beetles of the subfamily Lamiinae. It was described by John Lawrence LeConte in 1854.

References

Beetles described in 1854
Acanthocinus